Atlanta, Georgia is home to the largest concentration of colleges and universities in the Southern United States. This is a list of colleges and universities in the city of Atlanta and Metro Atlanta.

City of Atlanta

Universities and graduate institutions

American InterContinental University
Clark Atlanta University
DeVry University
Emory University
Annexed by the City of Atlanta effective January 1, 2018
Georgia Institute of Technology
Georgia State University
Interdenominational Theological Center
John Marshall Law School
Mercer University (Cecil B. Day Graduate and Professional Campus)
Morehouse School of Medicine
University of Georgia (Terry College of Business Atlanta Center)

Colleges

Art Institute of Atlanta
Atlanta Metropolitan State College
 Carver College
Chamberlain College of Nursing
Herzing College
Morehouse College
Morris Brown College
Evangeline Booth College (The Salvation Army)
Savannah College of Art and Design (Atlanta campus) 
Spelman College

Community and technical colleges
Atlanta Technical College

Neighboring cities and towns

Universities and graduate institutions

Brenau University (Fairburn)
Brenau University (Gainesville)
Brenau University (Norcross)
Clayton State University (Morrow)
Columbia Theological Seminary (Decatur)
Kennesaw State University (Kennesaw)
Life University (Marietta)
Oglethorpe University (Brookhaven)
Philadelphia College of Osteopathic Medicine (Georgia campus) (Suwanee)
University of Georgia (Gwinnett Campus) (Lawrenceville); (Main Campus) (Athens)
University of North Georgia (multiple campuses north of Atlanta)
University of West Georgia (Carrollton)

Colleges

Agnes Scott College (Decatur)
Ashworth College (Norcross)
Georgia Gwinnett College (Lawrenceville)
Oxford College (Oxford)
Point University (West Point)

Community and technical colleges
Chattahoochee Technical College (Marietta)
Georgia Perimeter College (Decatur)
Georgia Piedmont Technical College (Clarkston)
Gwinnett College (Lilburn)
Gwinnett College - Sandy Springs (Sandy Springs)
Gwinnett Technical College (Lawrenceville)
Laurus Technical Institute (Decatur and Jonesboro) (CLOSED MARCH 2015)
North Metro Technical College (Acworth)

See also
List of colleges and universities in Georgia (U.S. state)

References

A
 
Colleges
Education in the Atlanta metropolitan area